Nenad Jakovljević (born 30 October 1988) is a Serbian professional basketball coach and scout currently serves as an assistant coach for Crvena zvezda of the EuroLeague and the ABA League and a scout for the Serbia men's national basketball team.

Coaching career 
Jakovljević the most of his early coaching career in Italy working for youth systems of Virtus Alto Garda (based in Riva del Garda) and Dolomiti Energia Trento. In 2015, he had a stint with Bayern Munich working as an assistant coach of head coaches Svetislav Pešić and Oliver Kostić.

In August 2022, Crvena zvezda added Jakovljević to their coaching staff as an assistant coach for the 2022–23 season.

In August 2022, Serbia national team head coach Svetislav Pešić added Jakovljević as a scout and video coordinator to his coaching staff. He was a staff member at EuroBasket 2022.

Personal life 
Jakovljević moved to Trento, Italy at age 17. He earned his bachelor's degree in political science from the University of Trento in 2013 and earned his master's degree in sports marketing and management from the Ca' Foscari University of Venice in 2015.

References

External links

 

1988 births
Living people
Ca' Foscari University of Venice alumni
KK Crvena zvezda assistant coaches
Serbian basketball scouts
Serbian expatriate basketball people in France
Serbian expatriate basketball people in Germany
Serbian expatriate basketball people in Italy
Serbian men's basketball coaches
Sportspeople from Sremska Mitrovica
University of Trento alumni